Bert Brinkman (born April 4, 1968, in Nijverdal) is a retired water polo player from the Netherlands, who finished in ninth position with the Dutch team at the 1992 Summer Olympics in Barcelona.

See also
 Netherlands men's Olympic water polo team records and statistics
 List of men's Olympic water polo tournament goalkeepers

External links
 

1968 births
Living people
People from Hellendoorn
Dutch male water polo players
Water polo goalkeepers
Olympic water polo players of the Netherlands
Water polo players at the 1992 Summer Olympics
Sportspeople from Overijssel
20th-century Dutch people